William Stemson (30 June 1867 – 13 June 1951) was a New Zealand cricketer. He played 31 first-class matches for Auckland between 1889 and 1909.

See also
 List of Auckland representative cricketers

References

External links
 

1867 births
1951 deaths
New Zealand cricketers
Auckland cricketers
Cricketers from Christchurch
North Island cricketers